The Muzaka were an Albanian noble family that ruled over the region of Myzeqe (southern Albania) in the Late Middle Ages. The Muzaka are also referred to by some authors as a tribe or a clan. The earliest historical document that mention Muzaka family is written in 1090 by the Byzantine historian Anna Komnene. At the end of the 13th and beginning of the 14th century members of the Muzaka family controlled a region between the rivers of Devoll and Vjosë. Some of them were loyal to the Byzantine Empire while some of them allied with Charles of Anjou who gave them (and some other members of Albanian nobility) impressive Byzantine-like titles (such as Sebastokrator) in order to subdue them more easily. During a short period, Serbian Emperor Stefan Dušan (r. 1331-1355) occupied Albania including domains of Muzaka family but after Dušan's death they regained their former possessions. After the Battle of Savra in 1385 the territory of Albania came under the Ottoman Empire; they served the Ottomans until 1444 when Theodor Corona Musachi joined Skanderbeg's rebellion. When the Ottomans suppressed Skanderbeg's rebellion and captured the territory of Venetian Albania in the 15th century many members of the Muzaka family retreated to Italy. Those who stayed in Ottoman Albania lost their feudal rights, some converted to Islam and achieved high ranks in the Ottoman military and administrative hierarchy.

Notable members of the family include Andrea II Muzaka, Gjon Muzaka, Theodor Corona Musachi and  Andrea I Muzaka, among others. The last notable member of Muzaka family who found refugee in Italy died in Naples in 1600.

History

Origin
The Muzaka were one of the most important families of Albanian origin. The family came from  the lower Opar region (Lekas). In the area of the village of Lavdar and nearby hamlets are many of the ancestral burial grounds of the family. Gjon Muzaka claimed that the family received its name from the Muzeqë region, named after its population, the Molossians, through the corruption of the name Molossi (into Molosachi and finally Musachi). The coat of arms of Muzaka family was a two-headed eagle.

Late Middle Ages

In 1090, the earliest mention of the Muzaka family, as a loyal commander of Alexios I Komnenos (r. 1081-1118), was in the work of Byzantine historian Anna Komnene. One of the first notable members of the family was Andrea I Muzaki who was, like some other members of the Albanian nobility, given impressive Byzantine-like title like sebastokrator by Charles of Anjou in order to subdue them more easily. In 1279, Gjon I Muzaka, who remained loyal to the Byzantines and resisted the Angevin conquest of Albania, was captured by the forces of Charles of Anjou, but under the pressure of local Albanian nobles he was later released. The Muzaka family continued to remain loyal to the Byzantine Empire and resisted the expansion of the Serbian Kingdom. At the end of the 13th and beginning of the 14th century members of the Muzaka family controlled a region between the rivers of Devoll and Vjosë. Andrea I ruled in the period of 1280—1319; Andrea II ruled, with some interruptions, in the period between 1319 and 1372. In 1319 three members of the Muzaka family even tried to get help from the Pope. For their loyalty to Byzantium, the head of the family Andrea II Muzaka gained the title of Despot in 1335, while other Muzakas continued to pursue careers in the Byzantine government in Constantinople.

As soon as Andrea II Muzaka had obtained the title of despot, he endorsed an anti-Byzantine revolt (1335-1341) in his domains, and also formed an alliance with the Anjou from Naples on 30 December 1336, whereas he was recognized as a vassal of Robert, Prince of Taranto. As proof of his fidelity to the Capetian House of Anjou, Andrea II Muzaka had to leave one of his sons as hostage in Durazzo.

In 1336, the Serbian Empire under Stefan Dušan captured Angevin-controlled Durazzo, including the territory under the control of the Muzaka family. Although Angevins managed to recapture Durazzo, Dušan continued his expansion, and in the period of 1337—45 he had captured Kanina and Valona (in modern-day southern Albania). Muzaka nobility waged against Serbian forces was around 1340 when forces of Andrew II Muzaka defeated the Serbian army at the Pelister mountain. After the death of Stefan Dušan in 1355 and collapse of the Serbian Empire, the Muzaka family of Berat regained control over parts of the south-eastern modern-day Albania and also over northern Greece with Kastoria that Andrew II Musachi captured from Prince Marko after the Battle of Marica in 1371.

After the death of Andrew II Muzaka in 1372 his descendants inherited control over his former domains. Theodor II Muzaka inherited control over Muzaqeya and Berat while Kastoria was inherited by his son Gjin (1337—1389). According to chronicle of Gjon Muzaka (repeated in some historical works) Comita, one of the daughters of Andrew II Muzaka, married Balša II. Other authors confirm that Balša II married in 1372 and gained control over the territory south of Durazzo, including Valona and Kanine, as dowry. Still, many scholars believe that Balša II did not marry Comita Muzaka but Komnena, daughter of John Komnenos Asen who succeeded control over Valona and Kanine after the death of her brother Alexander in early 1372. The same chronicle mentions Theodor II Muzaka as one of participants of the Battle of Kosovo in 1389, together with Prince Marko. The Muzaka family was in conflict with Prince Marko before his death in 1396 which is probably why Theodor Corona Musachi is commemorated in south Slavic and Serbian epic poetry as Korun Aramija, Marko's enemy.

A Greek Orthodox church (Church of St Athanasius of Mouzaki) located in Kastoria, Greece was built in 1383–84 by Teodor II Muzaka and dedicated to St. Athanasius. Teodor II Muzaka died in 1389 against the Ottomans in the battle of Kosovo.

Ottoman Empire period 

After the Battle of Savra in 1385 the region of Myzeqe and most of Albanian nobility, came under control of the Ottoman Empire. The first signs of the rivalry between Venice and Ottomans in Albania appeared first in 1387 and after the death of Gjergj Thopia in 1391, when many Albanian noblemen including Andrea III Muzaka came under strong influence of Venice. To break out the influence of Venice Bayezid I launched a campaign in 1394 and restored Ottoman control over most of Albania.

In period 1415—17 Ottoman Empire annexed Vlorë and Berat and ended the rule of Muzaka family, though some of its members converted to Islam and became Ottoman officials, like Jakub Bey son of Theodor Corona Musachi, who was sanjakbey of the Ottoman Sanjak of Albania during the Albanian Revolt of 1432–36. There are claims that Jakub's father Theodor Corona Musachi participated in the revolt while some sources emphasize that no contemporary documents support such claims. Jakub Bey Muzaka was on the position of the sanjakbey of the Sanjak of Albania until September 1442 when he was one of 16 Ottoman sanjakbeys under command of Sihàb ed-Dîn Pasa who were all killed by Christian forces commanded by Janos Hunyadi in a battle near Ialomița River. He had a son named Jusuf Celebi who is recorded as a timariot in Kalkandelen (Tetovo) in 1455.

In 1444 Theodor Corona Musachi joined Skanderbeg's rebellion. In 1455 Skanderbeg tried to recapture the city but failed. After his death many members of noble families from Albania who were before opposed to the Ottomans, like Arianiti, Zenebishi and Muzaka family, converted to Islam and achieved high ranks in the military and administrative hierarchy in Ottoman Albania. Although they were often left to rule lands they inherited from their ancestors, the new Ottoman regime obliged them to abandon part of their territories and their feudal rights.

According to some sources the last member of Muzaka family died in Naples in 1600. Still, there are other notable people recorded as members of the Muzaka family after 1600. In the middle of the 18th century a sanjakbey of the Sanjak of Avlona was Ahmet Pasha Kurt from the Muzaka family who was later appointed to the position of derbendci aga (guardian of the mountain passes) which he held until the sultan appointed Ahmet's grandson, Ali Pasha Tepelena, instead of him.

Notable members 
Notable members of Muzaka family include:

 Andrea I Muzaka (fl. 1280—1313)
 Teodor I Muzaka (fl. 1319—1331)
 Andrea II Muzaka (fl. 1331-1372)
 Mentula Muzaka (fl. 1319), lord of Këlcyrë
 Teodor II Muzaka (d. 1389)
Voisava Kastrioti (fl. 1402—1405)
 Teodor III Muzaka (fl. 1389—1412)
 Teodor III Muzaka (d. 1449), Lord of Berat (r. ?—1417)
 Maria Muzaka, the first wife of Gjergj Arianiti and mother of Donika Kastrioti, Skanderbeg's wife.
 Jakub bey, sanjakbey of the Sanjak of Albania (fl. 1432—1442).
 Gjin III Muzaka, titular despot of Epirus.
 Gjon Muzaka (fl. 1510)
 Kostandin Muzaka, mentioned as one of the leaders of the uprising in Ottoman Albania in 1481.
 Ahmet Pasha Kurt, the 18th century sanjakbey of the Sanjak of Avlona

See also 
 Church of St Athanasius of Mouzaki
 Principality of Berat

References

Sources
 
 
 

 
14th-century Albanian people
15th-century Albanian people
Byzantine families
League of Lezhë